The Spur House is a historic house off Old Common Road in Dublin, New Hampshire.  Built in 1901, it is a good local example of Colonial Revival architecture, designed by architect Charles A. Platt.  The house was listed on the National Register of Historic Places in 1983.

Description and history
The Spur House is sited on the spur of Beech Hill, overlooking Dublin Pond, and is accessed via a winding drive off Old Common Road.  It is a two-story wood-frame structure, with a hip roof and clapboarded exterior. Its main facade is five bays wide, with symmetrically placed but differently sized windows placed around the main entrance.  The entrance is framed by a gabled surround, and one of the upper windows has a rounded top, corresponding in placement to the stairwell inside.  The east end of the building has an open porch with pergola, while the west end has a later 20th-century addition and enclosed porch.

The house was designed by Charles A. Platt and built in 1901.  It was commissioned by Platt's sister, Mrs. Francis Jencks, for her sister-in-law's family. The Jencks mansion, Beech Hill, is further up the hill, and was also designed by Platt.  The two buildings are among a small number of Dublin summer properties attributed to Platt.

See also
National Register of Historic Places listings in Cheshire County, New Hampshire

References

Houses on the National Register of Historic Places in New Hampshire
Colonial Revival architecture in New Hampshire
Houses completed in 1901
Houses in Dublin, New Hampshire
National Register of Historic Places in Dublin, New Hampshire